Baron Feyzi (1893 – 5 May 1978) was a Turkish footballer. He played in one match for the Turkey national football team in 1923. He was also part of Turkey's squad for the football tournament at the 1928 Summer Olympics, but he did not play in any matches.

References

External links
 

1893 births
1978 deaths
Turkish footballers
Turkey international footballers
Place of birth missing
Association football midfielders
Olympic footballers of Turkey
Footballers at the 1928 Summer Olympics
Altınordu F.K. players